The 1965 AFL Championship Game was the American Football League's sixth championship game, played on December 26 at Balboa Stadium in San Diego, California.

It matched the Western Division champion San Diego Chargers (9–2–3) and the Eastern Division champion Buffalo Bills (10–3–1) to decide the American Football League (AFL) champion for the 1965 season.

The defending champion Bills entered the game as 6½ point underdogs; the Chargers had won the first regular season meeting on October 10 by a convincing 34–3 score, and tied the Thanksgiving rematch at twenty points each.

In favorable  conditions on the day after Christmas, the Bills shut out the Chargers and repeated as champions, scoring two touchdowns in the second quarter, one on a punt return. They added three field goals in the second half to win 23–0. Of the ten AFL title games, this was the only shutout: the Chargers had advanced to five of the first six, but won only one, in 1963.

Bills' quarterback Jack Kemp, the league's most valuable player, was named MVP of the game; he and Paul Maguire were among the five ex-Chargers on the Bills' roster that were previously released by San Diego head coach Sid Gillman.

This was the last AFL Championship to end the season; the AFL–NFL merger agreement was made the following June, and the first Super Bowl followed the 1966 season.

Game summary

Officials

Referee: Jim Barnhill
Umpire: Walt Parker
Head Linesman: Henry Kessel
Back Judge: Jack Reader
Field Judge: Ben Dreith

Alternate: Elvin Hutchison

The AFL still had five game officials in 1965; the NFL added a sixth official this season, the line judge.

Referee Jim Barnhill died less than three months after this game; while officiating a basketball playoff game in Wisconsin, he collapsed and died at age 45.

Players' shares
The winning Bills players were allocated $5,189 each, while the Chargers players received $3,447 each. This was twice as much as the previous year and about 70% of the players' shares for the NFL championship game.

Because of the smaller venue, the attendance was nearly 10,000 lower than 1964, but the television money was increased with NBC.

Aftermath
This game marked the first time the AFL Championship Game was televised in color, and the last time that a final pro football championship was decided in December, within the same calendar year as regular season games (the 1965 NFL Championship Game was played on January 2, 1966). The following season would conclude with the first Super Bowl played in January 1967.

This is the last professional American football championship game to have been won by a team from Buffalo, New York, as well as the last of any major league team from the city. Indeed, the fortunes of both teams, and for that matter both cities, would go southward since then. The Bills would not appear in another championship game until Super Bowl XXV when the infamous Wide Right occurred, and would also proceed to lose the next three Super Bowls. The Chargers meanwhile would not appear in another championship until Super Bowl XXIX, which they lost to the San Francisco 49ers, 49-26. San Diego and Buffalo currently have the longest and second-longest championship droughts respectively for any city that has at least two major sports franchises.

See also
1965 AFL season
 AFL Championship Games
 1965 NFL Championship Game

References

1965
Buffalo Bills postseason
San Diego Chargers postseason
Championship Game
American football in San Diego
December 1965 sports events in the United States
1965 in sports in California